Bierawa  is a village in Kędzierzyn-Koźle County, Opole Voivodeship, in south-western Poland. It is the seat of the gmina (administrative district) called Gmina Bierawa.

The village has a population of 1,370.

History
The name of the village probably comes from the Polish verb brać, which means "to take". In the Middle Ages it was part of Piast-ruled Poland, and afterwards it was also part of Bohemia (Czechia), Prussia and Germany. In 1936, the German administration changed the name to Reigersfeld in attempt to erase traces of Polish origin. During World War II the Germans operated two forced labour subcamps (E711, E769) of the Stalag VIII-B/344 prisoner-of-war camp in the local IG Farben factory. The village became again part of Poland after the defeat of Nazi Germany in World War II in 1945, and its historic Polish name was restored.

Bierawa suffered from the 1997 Central European flood.

Transport
There is a train station, located on the Polish Railway Line No. 151 which connects Kędzierzyn-Koźle and the Polish-Czech border at Chałupki.

Gallery

References

Bierawa